Channel One is a recording studio in Maxfield Avenue, West Kingston, Jamaica. The studio was built by the Hoo Kim brothers in 1972, and has had a profound influence on the development of reggae music.

History
Joseph Hoo Kim's parents ran a bar and ice cream parlour in Kingston, and Kim became interested in opening a studio after visiting Dynamic Sound with John Holt. He purchased the API studio console for $38,000 and allowed other producers to record at Channel One without charge after it opened to build up custom. When it opened Channel One's tape recorders were capable of recording on a maximum of only four tracks. There were early problems with the studio's sound, with Bunny Lee recording an album there with Alton Ellis which he didn't release due to these issues. The problems were resolved within a year, and the first hit single recorded at the studio was Delroy Wilson's 1973 recording of "It's a Shame".

In 1975, the studio was upgraded to a 16-track recorder which enabled engineers to record each instrument distinctly, lending intricacy to dub mixes and giving rise to the "rockers" sound. According to 2006's Caribbean Popular Music, the studio became widely known after the 1976 release of The Mighty Diamonds' Right Time. Other artists to have successful recordings at the studio include Horace Andy, Leroy Smart, The Wailing Souls, The Meditations, Ernest Wilson, The Jays, and Jimmy Cliff, whose Follow My Mind album was recorded there.

The studio's house band, The Revolutionaries, were one of the top studio bands of the 1970s.

Joseph ran the studio and was credited as producer, Ernest acted as studio engineer, and Paul ran the sound system associated with the studio. Kenneth began producing in the 1980s. They became less involved after the second oldest brother Paul was killed in 1977, but it remained popular with other producers into the 1980s, with Sly and Robbie and Henry "Junjo" Lawes recording many of their productions there. The studio closed in the early 1990s. Kenneth Hoo Kim died from lung cancer in October 2013, aged 66.

Channel One is also the name of the brothers' sound system and record label.

References

Reggae
Recording studios in Jamaica
Buildings and structures in Kingston, Jamaica